Jim Jackson (born March 23, 1963) is an American professional sportscaster. He currently serves as the TV play-by-play announcer for the Philadelphia Flyers. Jackson formerly did radio play-by-play broadcasting duties for the 4th and 5th innings of Phillies home games.

Philadelphia Flyers
Jackson, an Upstate New York native, started his professional career broadcasting for the Utica Devils after graduating from Syracuse University. In 1993, he became the radio play-by-play broadcaster for the Philadelphia Flyers, replacing Gene Hart, who had gone back onto television. Two seasons later, Jackson was promoted to the television side where he remains to this day. He has been the play-by-play voice of the Flyers on television for 26 seasons, now covering the games on NBC Sports Philadelphia with Keith Jones.

Philadelphia Phillies and other experience
Beginning in 2007, Jackson took on pre-game and post-game host duties for Philadelphia Phillies radio broadcasts, occasionally providing play-by-play if another member of the broadcast crew was absent. In 2010, his role was expanded to include play-by-play during the fourth and fifth innings of all regular season home games that did not conflict with his Flyers schedule. He has previous baseball experience as radio play-by-play voice of the Utica Blue Sox of the New York–Penn League from 1986 to 1993 and of the Eastern League's Trenton Thunder in 2005. He has also called college football, basketball, and lacrosse during his broadcasting tenure. He was laid off in 2020.

Personal life
Jackson has two children, Deanna, born 1997, and Johnny, born 2000. He lives in Gloucester Township, New Jersey.

References

External links 

 "Hockey's Great Voices Echo Through Generations" at NHL.com. Retrieved 10-20-06.

1963 births
Living people
American Hockey League broadcasters
American radio sports announcers
American television sports announcers
College basketball announcers in the United States
College football announcers
Lacrosse announcers
Major League Baseball broadcasters
Minor League Baseball broadcasters
National Hockey League broadcasters
People from Gloucester Township, New Jersey
Philadelphia Flyers announcers
Philadelphia Phillies announcers
S.I. Newhouse School of Public Communications alumni
Utica Devils